Kenneth F. Lemont (born June 21, 1951) is an American politician from Maine. A Republican from Kittery, Maine, Lemont served in the Maine House of Representatives from 1992 to 2000. Unable to seek re-election in 2000 to the House due to term limits, Lemont was elected the Maine Senate over Democrat Catherine Woodard of South Berwick.

Re-elected in 2002 against Democrat Larry Deater of Kittery, Lemont did not seek re-election in 2004 and was replaced by fellow Republican Mary Andrews.

Lemont graduated from Bentley College in 1973 with a Bachelor of Science degree. He and his wife Gail have two sons.

References

1951 births
Living people
Politicians from Waltham, Massachusetts
People from Kittery, Maine
Bentley University alumni
Republican Party Maine state senators
Republican Party members of the Maine House of Representatives
21st-century American politicians